Keith Rivers (born May 5, 1986) is a former American football linebacker. He was drafted by the Cincinnati Bengals ninth overall in the 2008 NFL Draft and also played for the New York Giants and Buffalo Bills. He played college football at USC.

Early life
Rivers was a decorated letterman in football at Lake Mary High School in Lake Mary, Florida. His awards include USA Today All-USA first team, Parade All-American, Super Prep All-American, Prep Star All-American, EA Sports All-American, Insiders.com All-American, Super Prep Elite 50, Prep Star Top 100 Dream Team, Lemming Top 10, Super Prep All-Dixie, Prep Star All-Southeast, Fox Sports Net All-South, Gatorade Florida Player of the Year and Florida Class 6A Mr. Football runner-up as a senior linebacker.  He played in the 2004 U.S. Army All-American Bowl.

College career
Rivers was heavily recruited.  Then-University of Florida coach Ron Zook, noted for his recruiting ability, made a strong push, including talking to Rivers at 2 a.m. on National Signing Day in 2003.  In the end, Rivers selected USC; and, to cinch the pact, the Trojan coaching staff committed to bestowing Rivers, a worthy future player, with the famed USC linebacker jersey # 55 to wear during his Trojan career, which is selectively awarded and has traditionally been given to a promising linebacker with the potential of becoming a USC football and NFL great, and includes past Trojan and NFL star players, all members of the so-called USC linebacker "Club 55", such as Junior Seau, Willie McGinest and Chris Claiborne.

USC linebacker coach Ken Norton Jr nicknamed Rivers "the Shark" for his aggressive play on the field, juxtaposed to his polite demeanor off of it.

Rivers was on the watch list in 2006  for the Bednarik Award, Lombardi Award, Bronko Nagurski Trophy, and Lott Trophy.  He was 2006 Rivals.com and coaches first-team all-Pac-10. The All-American selection with 78 tackles, Rivers decided to stay for his senior season.

Rivers was a 2007 preseason Sporting News, Street & Smith's, Lindy's, Phil Steele's, Blue Ribbon and NationalChamps.net All-American.  At the end of the 2007 regular season, Rivers was selected to the All-Pacific-10 Conference first-team for the second year in a row by league coaches.  He was also selected to the SI.com All-American First-team.

He graduated from USC with a Bachelor of Science in Public Policy, Management, and Planning.

Professional career

Cincinnati Bengals
Rivers was drafted by the Cincinnati Bengals in the first round of the 2008 NFL Draft with the 9th overall pick. Rivers signed a contract with the Bengals on August 5, ending the 10-day holdout.

Keith Rivers began his rookie season with 10 tackles against the Baltimore Ravens. In the following game against the Tennessee Titans, Rivers totaled 8 tackles. Against the New York Giants, Rivers recorded two tackles, while against the Cleveland Browns Rivers defensive production totaled 8 tackles. Rivers' rookie season was abruptly ended due to a shattered jaw suffered during a block by Pittsburgh Steelers wide receiver Hines Ward in Week 7, when Ward's helmet struck Rivers' chin.  That action and the season-ending injury that resulted led to the NFL instituting the "Hines Ward Rule"  after the season, whereby it would henceforth be illegal for blockers to land a blindside block using their helmet, forearm or shoulder, to strike at the head or neck area of a defender.

Despite missing the final nine games, Rivers finished his rookie season with 37 tackles, one interception, and a forced fumble.  Rivers received the only vote for 2008 Defensive Rookie of the Year that didn't go to winner Jerod Mayo.

New York Giants
On April 11, 2012, Rivers was traded to the New York Giants for a 5th round draft pick in the 2012 NFL Draft.

Buffalo Bills
On March 12, 2014, Rivers signed a two-year, $5 million contract with the Buffalo Bills. Rivers was released by the Bills on February 17, 2015.

Dallas Cowboys
Rivers signed with the Dallas Cowboys in March 2015.

Rivers retired from football on the first day of Dallas Cowboys training camp, July 31, 2015.

NFL statistics

References

External links

Dallas Cowboys bio
Buffalo Bills bio
Cincinnati Bengals bio
USC Trojans bio

1986 births
Living people
Sportspeople from San Bernardino, California
Players of American football from California
American football linebackers
USC Trojans football players
Cincinnati Bengals players
New York Giants players
Buffalo Bills players
Dallas Cowboys players